Frances Donovan is a journalist and presenter who has anchored television and radio programmes across major events for both the BBC and ITV, including the Rugby World Cup, the Olympics, the Commonwealth Games and the BAFTAS.

Personal life 

Donovan was born in Cardiff, Wales, and is one of four siblings, the rest of whom are brothers. She went to school in Chepstow and at Haberdashers' Monmouth School for Girls. She read English and History at University College, Cardiff, and later obtained a postgraduate diploma in Broadcast Journalism in Bristol.
She is married to the Director of Photography and Lighting Director Andrew Cottey. She has two rescue dogs and is an active supporter of a number of animal welfare charities.

Career 

Donovan began her career as a radio reporter and presenter at 210FM in Reading before moving to Severn Sound Radio in Gloucester. Her first television role was a reporter at HTV West in Bristol, from where she went on to work for ITN, Sky, Channel 5 and Meridian Television. She was also a regular sports presenter on what was then News24 for the BBC.

She returned to Wales to become one of BBC Wales Sport's main anchors, where she hosted Wales on Saturday - the weekend results show - for four years, as well as BBC Sports Personality of the Year, Wales Open Golf, Welsh Open Snooker, International Bowls and Welsh Amateur Boxing. She was the first female presenter of BBC Wales' iconic rugby programme, Scrum Five.
She has reported for Match of the Day and Football Focus as well as The Open Championship for the BBC and has also fronted the sports news on BBC Breakfast.
She is also the host of ITV Wales' sport chat show In Touch, where her easy, conversational style has drawn major sports figures like Ole Gunnar Solskjær, Chris Coleman, Gareth Edwards, Craig Bellamy, Matthew Maynard, Garry Monk and Malky Mackay into the guest's chair.
Donovan is also a regular reporter for Premier League Productions, the television arm of the Barclays Premier League.
She hosted ITV Sport's LV Cup programming for the first time in 2015 and will be part of the ITV network team covering the 2015 Rugby World Cup.
She anchored ITV Wales' coverage of the 2011 Rugby World Cup and will reprise that role for the 2015 tournament.

Away from sport, Donovan is an authoritative news presenter, having co-anchored both Wales Tonight and The West Tonight for ITV. She tackled the business world for ITV Wales in The Secrets of My Success and indulged her love of history and the outdoors fronting History Hunters for the BBC.
She was one of the main presenters of Children in Need for BBC Wales for seven years and also hosted a seven-hour long Outside Broadcast from Cardiff Castle to mark the Queen's Jubilee.
Donovan presented ITV's popular arts and entertainment programme The Wales Show for several years, interviewing Ricky Gervais, Catherine Zeta Jones and Rhys Ifans amongst others.
She climbed a 100 ft telegraph pole and took part in the Pony Club mounted games during her time as one of the faces of the BBC's coverage of the Royal Welsh Show.

She is also the host of the lively sports quiz 'Extra Time' for BBC Radio Wales and is a regular guest anchor for the mid-morning magazine show.

Charity 

Donovan is a passionate advocate for animal rights and works with a number of charities to promote this.
In March 2012, she took on the gruelling First Nation Home challenge for Sport Relief as the only female competing member of Team Wales. Captained by Gethin Jones, they raced teams from Ireland, Scotland and England around the UK, cycling, running, sailing and rowing in the quest to be the First Nation Home.
She is also an ambassador for the Welsh Football Trust and St John Cymru.

References 

Living people
British television presenters
British women television presenters
Welsh television presenters
Welsh women television presenters
Year of birth missing (living people)